The 2007 Maidstone Borough Council election took place on 3 May 2007 to elect members of Maidstone Borough Council in Kent, England. One third of the council was up for election and the council stayed under no overall control.

After the election, the composition of the council was:
Conservative 26
Liberal Democrat 21
Labour 4
Independent 4

Background
Before the election the Conservatives were the largest party on the council with 27 seats, compared to 20 Liberal Democrats, 4 Labour and 4 independent councillors. 20 seats were up for election, with 2 of these in Bridge and South wards being by-elections after the resignation of the previous councillors.

The Conservatives held the seats of Detling and Thurnham and Sutton Valence and Langley without a contest after no other candidates stood in those seats. In total 64 candidates stood in the election, comprising 20 Conservatives, 16 Liberal Democrats, 11 Green party, 10 Labour, 5 independents and 2 British National Party. As well as the by-elections, 2 sitting councillors did not stand in the election, Liberal Democrat John Williams from Coxheath and Hunton ward and independent Janetta Sams from Harrietsham and Lenham ward.

Election result
The results saw no party win a majority on the council after the Liberal Democrats made a net gain of 1 seat from the Conservatives. This reduced the Conservatives to 26 seats and was a disappointment for them as Maidstone had been one of the party's top 10 targets in the 2007 local elections. Overall turnout in the election was 37.68%.

Ward results

References

2007 English local elections
2007
2000s in Kent